Bankhanda is a village in Hapur district in the Indian state Uttar Pradesh, which is located in national capital region The nearest local railway station is Kuchesar Road Chopla.

References

Villages in Ghaziabad district, India